Franjo Klein (1828–1889) was one of the most important architects in the period of an early and mature historicism in Croatia and the most prominent architect in Zagreb in the 1860s and 1870s.

Biography

Early work in Vienna and Bjelovar

Klein was born into an evangelical family in Vienna where he received training in building and stone carving trades and completed two years of architecture studies at the Academy of Fine Arts. For some time, he worked as a draughtsman in Vienna. He moved to Croatia in 1851, successfully applied for a job as a bricklayer foreman in the Varaždin-Đurđevac Regiment, and spent the next eight years working for the Regiment in Bjelovar, until he was transferred to Zagreb in 1859.

It is known that Klein designed and built a number of public buildings during his stay in Bjelovar, but there are no surviving records that would support a reliable attribution. It is conjectured that several buildings in Bjelovar - such as Adjutant's house (1855–1859), Sergeant Major's house (1855–1856) and the prison building (1854–1861) - were actually designed by Klein.

His earliest known work is the Church of the Assumption of the Blessed Virgin Mary in Molve, built between 1855 and 1862. It is the most significant example of Rundbogenstil in sacred architecture of Croatia.

Work in Zagreb

Klein was commissioned to build the Zagreb Synagogue. Construction began in 1866 and was completed the following year. He also built Zagreb Orthodox Cathedral located on the Petar Preradović Squ,are.

In 1868 Klein and Janko Grahor founded a construction company called Grahor and Klein. After Klein left the company in 1886, it was renamed to Grahor and Sons.

References

Bibliography

External links

 Župna crkva Uznesenja Blažene Djevice Marije i sakralna baština župe Molve 

1828 births
1889 deaths
Architects from Vienna
Academy of Fine Arts Vienna alumni
19th-century Croatian architects